Tom Scott (born June 25, 1970) is a former American football offensive lineman who played one season with the Cincinnati Bengals of the National Football League. He was drafted by the Cincinnati Bengals in the sixth round of the 1993 NFL Draft. He played college football at East Carolina University and attended Union High School in Clinton, North Carolina.

References

External links
Just Sports Stats

Living people
1970 births
Players of American football from North Carolina
American football offensive linemen
East Carolina Pirates football players
Cincinnati Bengals players
People from Burke County, North Carolina